Night Hunter is a 2018 Canadian action thriller film written and directed by David Raymond. The film stars Henry Cavill, Ben Kingsley, Alexandra Daddario, and Stanley Tucci, with Brendan Fletcher, Minka Kelly, and Nathan Fillion in supporting roles. It premiered at the LA Film Festival on September 28, 2018, originally titled as Nomis. It was later released on August 8, 2019, by DirecTV on video on demand and theatrically on September 6, 2019, by Saban Films.

Plot
When the body of a young woman is found on a lumber truck in Minnesota, Detective Walter Marshall suspects that the victim leapt to her death to escape from a captor. A breakthrough is inadvertently made in the case when former judge Michael Cooper's vigilante sting to capture a child predator results in his ward Lara being kidnapped. Through a tracker in Lara's earrings, Marshall finds her and other captive young women in a mansion owned by Simon Stulls, a man who appears to suffer from mental disability. Simon is arrested and the police attempt to determine if he is responsible for the abductions. In investigating Simon's background, they discover that he was born from rape and his mother attempted suicide before giving birth to him. Marshall informs Cooper he's sorry for what happened to his family.

While Simon is in custody, the police force finds themselves being targeted by another attacker. Technician Matthew Quinn is killed in a car bombing and fellow technician Glasow is forced to free Simon when the life of his infant daughter is threatened. The police recapture Simon after he has killed his father, just as Cooper discovers that Lara is missing. Believing Simon to be responsible, Cooper ambushes his police transport when he is surprised by another man who looks exactly like Simon. It is then revealed that Simon is in fact a pair of identical twins, with one being behind the kidnappings and the other truly having learning disabilities. The twins kill Cooper and kidnap police profiler Rachel Chase before escaping.

Using a tracker that Simon left in the police station, a team led by Marshall locates the twins by an icy lake where they are holding Rachel and Lara. Lara escapes and Marshall takes the learning disabled brother hostage to convince the malevolent brother to release Rachel. After Rachel is freed, Marshall tells the twin to hug his brother. The learning disabled twin complies, causing both brothers to fall through the ice and drown.

Afterwards, Lara reads a letter from Cooper thanking her for all that she has done. Marshall visits his daughter Faye accompanied by Rachel, implying that Marshall and Rachel have entered into a relationship.

Cast

Production
Fortitude International introduced the film to buyers at the Berlin International Film Festival. David Raymond wrote and directed the film and was also a producer alongside Fortitude’s Robert Ogden Barnum, Arise Pictures’ Chris Pettit and Buffalo Gals’ Jeff Beesley. Rick Dugdale was also a producer and Fortitudes’ Nadine De Barros was executive producer.

Casting
Henry Cavill, Ben Kingsley and Alexandra Daddario were announced to star on February 10, 2017. Minka Kelly, Stanley Tucci, Nathan Fillion, and Brendan Fletcher were announced on March 7, 2017 after filming had commenced.

Filming
Principal photography began on February 25, 2017 in Winnipeg, Manitoba and was completed on April 3, 2017.

Reception
The site's critical consensus reads, "Contrived and cliched, Night Hunter wastes a solid cast in pursuit of action-adventure thrills that stubbornly refuse to materialize." On Metacritic it has a weighted average score of 31 out of 100 based on reviews from 10 critics, indicating "generally unfavorable reviews".

Roger Moore of Movie Nation described the film as "cracked and incoherent" and criticized it for "[having] a lot of clutter, convoluted craziness and head-slappingly illogical turns in here, too", concluding that "whatever coherence the players saw on the screenplay page was lost in the trip from page to the shoot on set, and from the set to the editing bay". He gave the film 1.5/4 stars. Justin Lowe, writing for The Hollywood Reporter, described the film's plot as "overly complicated", further stating that "Narrative and stylistic references to Se7en, Split, The Silence of the Lambs and other serial-killer thrillers only manage to demonstrate how inadequately Nomis rates by comparison."

References

External links
 
 
 

2018 action thriller films
Canadian action thriller films
English-language Canadian films
Films shot in Winnipeg
2010s English-language films
2010s Canadian films